Gala is a French language weekly celebrity and gossip magazine published in Paris, France. The magazine also has international editions in various languages.

History and profile
Gala was first published in 1993. The magazine is published by Prisma Media on a weekly basis. The headquarters of the weekly is in Paris. The editor-in-chief is Juliette Serfati. The magazine provides news on significant figures from entertainment, fashion and society and targets women.

Gala has five editions. The magazine is published in German, Greek, and Polish languages. The German edition of Gala was established in 1994 and is published weekly.

Gala had a circulation of 264,000 copies in France in 2010. In the period of 2013-2014 the circulation of the magazine was 234,175 copies.

References

External links

Prisma Media
1993 establishments in France
Arabic-language magazines
Celebrity magazines
French-language magazines
Weekly magazines published in France
Women's magazines published in France
German-language magazines
Magazines established in 1993
Magazines published in Paris
Russian-language magazines